Huron Township is a township in Des Moines County, Iowa, United States.

History
Huron Township was established in 1848.

References

Townships in Des Moines County, Iowa
Townships in Iowa